Stephen Cassan may refer to:

 Stephen Hyde Cassan (1789–1841), English Anglican priest and ecclesiastical biographer
 Stephen Cassan (barrister) (1758–1794), Irish barrister in Calcutta